is a Japanese sport shooter who competed in the 1988 Summer Olympics and in the 1992 Summer Olympics.

References

1949 births
Living people
Japanese male sport shooters
ISSF pistol shooters
Olympic shooters of Japan
Shooters at the 1988 Summer Olympics
Shooters at the 1992 Summer Olympics
Shooters at the 1978 Asian Games
Shooters at the 1982 Asian Games
Shooters at the 1986 Asian Games
Shooters at the 1990 Asian Games
Asian Games medalists in shooting
Asian Games gold medalists for Japan
Asian Games silver medalists for Japan
Asian Games bronze medalists for Japan
Medalists at the 1978 Asian Games
Medalists at the 1982 Asian Games
Medalists at the 1986 Asian Games
Medalists at the 1990 Asian Games
20th-century Japanese people